Multidentia sclerocarpa is a species of flowering plants in the family Rubiaceae. It is found in Kenya and Tanzania.

References

Multidentia
Vulnerable plants
Flora of Kenya
Flora of Tanzania
Taxonomy articles created by Polbot
Taxa named by Diane Mary Bridson
Taxa named by Karl Moritz Schumann